Francis Andrew Brewin  (September 3, 1907 – September 21, 1983) was a lawyer and Canadian politician and Member of Parliament. He was the grandson of Liberal cabinet minister Andrew George Blair. His son John Brewin also served in the House of Commons of Canada.

Biography 
Born in Brighton, England, Brewin was a stalwart in the Co-operative Commonwealth Federation (CCF) and ran numerous times at the federal and provincial levels in the 1940 and 1950s. As a lawyer in the 1940s, he was retained by the Co-operative Committee on Japanese Canadians to contest the federal government's deportation orders affecting thousands of Japanese Canadians. Led by Brewin, the "Japanese Canadian Reference Case" was heard by the Supreme Court of Canada and later, on appeal, by the Judicial Committee of the Privy Council. Brewin was also retained by a committee of Japanese Canadians who had been detained during the Second World War as "enemy aliens" in order to try to have their property restored. He succeeded in persuading the government to call a royal commission to investigate the question.

In 1945, he was asked by Ontario CCF leader Ted Jolliffe to be co-counsel during the infamous LeBel Royal Commission that was looking into whether or not Ontario's premier at the time was employing a secret political police force. He was, for a time, the President of the Ontario CCF and was a candidate for the leadership of the Ontario CCF at the party's 1953 leadership convention, but lost to Donald C. MacDonald.

Brewin stood as a CCF candidate several times, starting with the 1945 Canadian federal election in the riding of Toronto—St. Paul's, but was unsuccessful. He was first elected to the House of Commons of Canada on behalf of the CCF's successor, the New Democratic Party. Brewin sat as Member of Parliament for the Toronto riding of Greenwood from the 1962 election until his retirement in 1979.

Coming from the theological tradition of figures such as Richard Hooker, F. D. Maurice, and William Temple, Andrew Brewin considered himself a Christian socialist and wrote a number of books and pamphlets on the topic. He was a member of the Fellowship for a Christian Social Order and the League for Social Reconstruction.

Andrew Brewin wrote the book Stand on Guard: The Search for a Canadian Defence Policy, published by McClelland & Stewart in 1965, that explored Canada's military's changing role in the mid-twentieth century, including its participation in the then new concept of United Nations peacekeeping.

Brewin died on 21 September 1983.

Electoral record

See also
 Internment of Japanese Canadians

References

Footnotes

Bibliography

Archives 
Francis Andrew Brewin fonds at Library and Archives Canada.

External links
 

1907 births
1983 deaths
20th-century Anglicans
20th-century Canadian lawyers
Anglican socialists
Canadian Anglicans
Canadian Christian socialists
Canadian people of English descent
Canadian people of Scottish descent
Canadian King's Counsel
Co-operative Commonwealth Federation (Ontario)
Lawyers in Ontario
Litigators
Members of the House of Commons of Canada from Ontario
New Democratic Party candidates for the Canadian House of Commons
New Democratic Party MPs
Canadian democratic socialists
Osgoode Hall Law School alumni
People educated at Radley College
People from Brighton
Politicians from Toronto
Co-operative Commonwealth Federation candidates for the Canadian House of Commons